Brittany Taylor may refer to:

 Brittany Taylor (Daria), a character on the US TV series Daria
 Brittany Taylor (soccer) (born 1987), American soccer player